Reasons to Stay Indoors is the fourth album from the Norwegian group Savoy, released Monday, October 8, 2001 in Norway and on February 25, 2002, in Sweden. As with Mountains of Time, a limited edition was released that included a CD bonus with five otherwise unavailable bonus tracks.

Track listing
"Reasons to Stay Indoors"
"You Won't Come to the Party"
"Face"
"Half of the Time"
"Once Upon a Year"
"Fearlist"
"I Wouldn't Change a Thing"
"Paramount"
"The One That Got Away"
"Against the Sun"
"Five Million Years"
"Overgrown"

Bonus disc

"You Should Have Told Me" (alternate version)
"I Wouldn't Change a Thing" (alternate version)
"Totally Hide"
"Once Upon a Year" (alternate version)
"D.A.R.

Personnel

Lead vocals, guitars, bass, keyboards, programming, arrangements:  Paul Waaktaar-Savoy
Lead vocals on Disc 1; 2, 6, 8, 10, 12 and Disc 2; 3, rhythm guitar, backing vocals: Lauren Savoy
Drums, backing vocals: Frode Unneland

All songs written by Paul Waaktaar-Savoy and Lauren Savoy.
Produced by Savoy and Michael Ilbert.

Charts

References

External links
Album listing on old Savoycentral.com page

2001 albums
Savoy (band) albums